Jamaliah Jamaluddin (born 16 March 1989; Jawi: جمالية جمال الدين ; simplified Chinese: 嘉玛莉亚 ; pinyin: Jiā mǎ lì yà) is a Malaysian politician from the Democratic Action Party, a component party of the Pakatan Harapan coalition. She is currently the State Assemblywoman for Bandar Utama under the Selangor State Legislative Assembly.

Personal life 

Jamaliah was born on 16 March 1989. She grew up in the Klang Valley and was the only child in the family. Her political interest was sparked in her teenage years, partly influenced by her father, Jamaluddin Ibrahim, who himself was a radio host and avid columnist at the time. Jamaliah also is widely known to be the granddaughter of the late Shamsiah Fakeh, a prominent Malaysian nationalist, feminist, and veteran leader of Angkatan Wanita Sedar (AWAS).

Education 

Jamaliah graduated with a First Class Diploma in Business Studies from the Management & Science University Malaysia (MSU). She continued her studies at Northwood University in the United States, majoring in International Business, where she obtained a First Class bachelor's degree in Business Studies and the honour of a Magna Cum Laude.

Political career 

Jamaliah began her involvement in politics when she started volunteering for the Democratic Action Party (DAP) in 2015. In 2016, she was chosen to become a Local Councillor under Majlis Bandaraya Petaling Jaya (MBPJ), as well as the special assistant to the then Assemblywoman for Damansara Utama, Yeo Bee Yin, serving in both positions until 2018. Jamaliah holds the post of Selangor Vice Chief & was formerly the National Vice-Treasurer for DAP Socialist Youth (DAPSY) from 2018 until 2021. She also holds a party position as a DAP Selangor State Committee Member.

Election to office 

In 2018, Jamaliah was fielded for the first time to contest on a DAP ticket under the Bandar Utama constituency for the Selangor State Assembly in the 14th General Elections, where she won 90.4% of the constituents’ votes with a 38,561 majority, making her one of the youngest representatives to be elected into the Selangor State Assembly. Following her election, Jamaliah expressed her main priorities to be the tackling of racial issues, and the empowerment of youths.

Election results

References

1989 births
Northwood University alumni
Living people
Malaysian women in state legislatures
Democratic Action Party (Malaysia) politicians
Women MLAs in Selangor